Stanislaw Czerski (October 10, 1777 in Latgale, Latvia – April 30, 1833 in Varniai, Lithuania) was a Polish Jesuit priest, graphic artist, and translator.

Czerski attended Polatsk Jesuit College. In 1794, he became a regular Jesuit, in 1807, a priest. He taught German language at Vitsebsk, Mahiliou, Polatsk, Orsha Jesuit colleges and Vilnius gymnasium. In 1814, he was a canon of Brest. Between 1819–1821, Czerski visited Paris, Germany, England, Italy for the scientific study tasks assigned by Vilnius University. In 1814, he became a canon of Varniai and in 1825, he was a priest in Salantai. It was here where he established wooden engraving workshop for making the maps and artworking the books. In 1822  he engraved Vilnius map in copper according to Georg Braun's Atlas, made in 1550, two vignettes for the Latin–Polish dictionary. He participated in the Uprising of 1831 and was arrested.

Czerski wrote in Polish and Latin. He translated fables by Phaedrus into Polish and Ode to God by Gavrila Derzhavin into Latin ("Carmen de Deo" in 1815), published the history of the land of Samogitia with engraved maps of Samogitian episcopate and Salantai parish, created Latin-Polish dictionary, wrote about lexicography issues.

References
 Stanislovas Čerskis’ Journey Across Western Europe Between 1819 And 1821 (Summary)  
 Karol Hoffman: Krajoznawcy polscy 
 Stanislovas Čerskis, in Lietuvių literatūros enciklopedija  
 J. Giżycki: Materyały do dziejów Akademii Połockiej i szkół od niej zależnych 
 Rys dziejów literatury polskiej (tom. 5, p. 244; 1878) -- short biography and list of works of Stanisław Czerski, on Google Books

1777 births
1833 deaths
18th-century Lithuanian Jesuits
Polish translators
19th-century Polish Roman Catholic priests
Jesuit College in Polotsk alumni